Bloody, as an adjective or adverb, is a commonly used expletive attributive in British English, Australian English, Irish English, Indian English and a number of other Commonwealth nations. It has been used as an intensive since at least the 1670s. Considered respectable until about 1750, it was heavily tabooed during c. 1750–1920, considered equivalent to heavily obscene or profane speech. Public use continued to be seen as controversial until the 1960s, but since then, the word has become a comparatively mild expletive or intensifier. In American English, the word is used almost exclusively in its literal sense, and when used as an intensifier it is seen by American audiences as a stereotypical marker of British English, without any significant obscene or profane connotation.  Canadian English usage is similar to American English, but use as an expletive adverb may be considered slightly vulgar depending on the circumstances.

Origin
Use of the adjective bloody as a profane intensifier predates the 18th century. Its ultimate origin is unclear, and several hypotheses have been suggested. It may be a direct loan of Dutch bloote, (modern spelling blote) meaning entire, complete or pure, which was suggested by Ker (1837) to have been "transformed into bloody, in the consequently absurd phrases of bloody good, bloody bad, bloody thief, bloody angry, etc., where it simply implies completely, entirely, purely, very, truly, and has no relation to either blood or murder, except by corruption of the word."

The word "blood" in Dutch and German is used as part of minced oaths, in abbreviation of expressions referring to "God's blood", i.e. the Passion or the Eucharist. Ernest Weekley (1921) relates English usage to imitation of purely intensive use of Dutch bloed and German Blut in the early modern period.

A popularly reported theory suggested euphemistic derivation from the phrase  by Our Lady. The contracted form by'r Lady is common in Shakespeare's plays around the turn of the 17th century, and Jonathan Swift about 100 years later writes both "it grows by'r Lady cold" and "it was bloody hot walking to-day" suggesting that bloody and by'r Lady  had become exchangeable generic intensifiers.
However, Eric Partridge (1933) describes the supposed derivation of bloody as a further contraction of by'r lady as "phonetically implausible". 

According to Rawson's dictionary of Euphemisms (1995), attempts to derive bloody from minced oaths for "by our lady" or "God's blood" are based on the attempt to explain the word's extraordinary shock power in the 18th to 19th centuries, but they disregard that the earliest records of the word as an intensifier in the 17th to early 18th century do not reflect any taboo or profanity. It seems more likely, according to Rawson, that the taboo against the word arose secondarily, perhaps because of an association with menstruation.

The Oxford English Dictionary prefers the theory that it arose from aristocratic rowdies known as "bloods", hence "bloody drunk" means "drunk as a blood".

History of use
Until at least the early 18th century, the word was used innocuously. It was used as an intensifier without apparent implication of profanity by 18th-century authors such as Henry Fielding and Jonathan Swift ("It was bloody hot walking today" in 1713) and Samuel Richardson ("He is bloody passionate" in 1742).

After about 1750 the word assumed more profane connotations. Johnson (1755) already calls it "very vulgar", and the original Oxford English Dictionary article of 1888 comments the word is "now constantly in the mouths of the lowest classes, but by respectable people considered 'a horrid word', on par with obscene or profane language".

On the opening night of George Bernard Shaw's comedy Pygmalion in 1914, Mrs Patrick Campbell, in the role of Eliza Doolittle, created a sensation with the line "Walk! Not bloody likely!" and this led to a fad for using "Pygmalion" itself as a pseudo-oath, as in "Not Pygmalion likely".

Usage outside the UK

Australia
Bloody has always been a very common part of Australian speech and has not been considered profane there for some time. The word was dubbed "the Australian adjective" by The Bulletin on 18 August 1894. One Australian performer, Kevin Bloody Wilson, has even made it his middle name. Also in Australia, the word bloody is frequently used as a verbal hyphen, or infix, correctly called tmesis as in "fanbloodytastic". In the 1940s an Australian divorce court judge held that "the word bloody is so common in modern parlance that it is not regarded as swearing".  Meanwhile, Neville Chamberlain's government was fining Britons for using the word in public.

United States
The word as an expletive is seldom used in the United States of America. In the US the term is usually used when the intention is to mimic an Englishman. Because it is not perceived as profane in American English, "bloody" is not censored when used in American television and film, for example in the 1961 film The Guns of Navarone the actor Richard Harris at one point says: "You can't even see the bloody cave, let alone the bloody guns. And anyway, we haven't got a bloody bomb big enough to smash that bloody rock ..." – but bloody was replaced with ruddy for British audiences of the time.

Canada
The term bloody as an intensifier is now overall fairly rare in Canada.. It is more commonly spoken in the Atlantic provinces, particularly Newfoundland. It may be considered mildly vulgar depending on the circumstances.

Singapore
In Singapore, the word bloody is commonly used as a mild expletive in Singapore's colloquial English. The roots of this expletive derives from the influence and informal language British officers used during the dealing and training of soldiers in the Singapore Volunteer Corps and the early days of the Singapore Armed Forces. When more Singaporeans were promoted officers within the Armed Forces, most new local officers applied similar training methods their former British officers had when they were cadets or trainees themselves. This includes some aspects of British Army lingo, like "bloody (something)". When the newly elected Singapore government implemented compulsory conscription, all 18-year-old able bodied Singapore males had to undergo training within the Armed Forces. When National servicemen completed their service term, some brought the many expletives they picked up during their service into the civilian world and thus became a part of the common culture in the city state.

Malaysia 
The word "bloody" also managed to spread up north in neighbouring Malaysia, to where the influence of Singapore English has spread. The use of "bloody" as a substitute for more explicit language increased with the popularity of British and Australian films and television shows aired on local television programmes. The term bloody in Singapore may not be considered explicit, but its usage is frowned upon in formal settings.

South Africa
The term is frequently used among South Africans in their colloquial English and it is an intensifier. It is used in both explicit and non-explicit ways. It also spread to Afrikaans as "bloedige" and is popular amongst many citizens in the country. It is also used by minors and is not considered to be offensive.

India
The term is also frequently used as a mild expletive or an intensifier in India.

Euphemisms
Many substitutions were devised to convey the essence of the oath, but with less offence; these included bleeding, bleaking, cruddy, smuddy, blinking, blooming, bally, woundy,  flaming and ruddy.

Publications such as newspapers, police reports, and so on may print b__y instead of the full profanity. 
A spoken language equivalent is blankety or, less frequently, blanked or blanky; the spoken words are all variations of blank, which, as a verbal representation of a dash, is used as a euphemism for a variety of "bad" words.

In composition
Use of bloody as an adverbial or generic intensifier is to be distinguished from its fixed use in the expressions "bloody murder" and "bloody hell". In "bloody murder", it has the original sense of an adjective used literally. The King James Version of the Bible frequently uses bloody as an adjective in reference to bloodshed or violent crime, as in "bloody crimes" (Ezekiel 22:2), "Woe to the bloody city" (Ezekiel 24:6, Nahum 3:1). "bloody men" (26:9, Psalms 59:2, 139:19), etc. The expression of "bloody murder" goes back to at least Elizabethan English, as in Shakespeare's Titus Andronicus (c. 1591), "bloody murder or detested rape".
The expression "scream bloody murder" (in the figurative or desemanticised sense of "to loudly object to something" attested since c. 1860) is now considered American English, while in British English, the euphemistic "blue murder" had replaced "bloody murder" during the period of "bloody" being considered taboo.

The expression "bloody hell" is now used as a general expression of surprise or as a general intensifier; e.g. "bloody hell" being used repeatedly in Harry Potter and the Philosopher's Stone (2001, PG Rating). In March 2006 Australia's national tourism commission, Tourism Australia, launched an advertising campaign targeted at potential visitors in several English-speaking countries. The ad sparked controversy because of its ending (in which a cheerful, bikini-clad spokeswoman delivers the ad's call-to-action by saying "...so where the bloody hell are you?"). In the UK the BACC required that a modified version of the ad be shown in the United Kingdom, without the word "bloody". In May 2006 the UK's Advertising Standards Authority ruled that the word bloody was not an inappropriate marketing tool and the original version of the ad was permitted to air.

In Canada, the ad was also affected as well and it created a lot of controversy within the term "bloody hell". According to the Adweek article that was posted on March 22, 2006, the U.K. bristled at Australia’s (“So where the bloody hell are you?”) tourism line, because of the word “bloody.” Now, possibly in an effort to seem different and/or cool, Canada has decided it doesn’t like the slogan either—because of the word “hell.” The CBC has said the ad is absolutely not bloody welcome on family programs. But to conclude from the Tourism Australia ad, the term "bloody" is fine in Canada, just not the extended "hell", due to family programming as mentioned earlier by CBC.

The longer "bloody hell-hounds" appears to have been at least printable in early 19th century Britain. "Bloody hell's flames" as well as "bloody hell" is reported as a profanity supposedly used by Catholics against Protestants in 1845.

References

External links
BBC News: Australian advert banned on UK TV
Limerick that makes reference to the expression "bloody ell"

British slang
Australian slang
New Zealand slang
English profanity
English words
Blood